Blandón is a Spanish surname.

Geographical distribution
As of 2014, 52.4% of all known bearers of the surname Blandón were residents of Nicaragua (frequency 1:162), 37.7% of Colombia (1:1,787), 2.9% of the United States (1:176,392), 1.5% of Costa Rica (1:4,518), 1.2% of Honduras (1:10,385) and 1.0% of Spain (1:67,619).

In Spain, the frequency of the surname was higher than average (1:67,619) in the following regions:
 1. Basque Country (1:31,778)
 2. Andalusia (1:33,697)
 3. Aragon (1:44,251)
 4. Navarre (1:53,051)
 5. Community of Madrid (1:60,440)

In Nicaragua, the frequency of the surname was higher than average (1:162) in the following departments:
 1. Jinotega (1:38)
 2. Estelí (1:61)
 3. Matagalpa (1:69)
 4. North Caribbean Coast (1:123)
 5. Nueva Segovia (1:146)

In Colombia, the frequency of the surname was higher than average (1:1,787) in the following departments:
 1. Chocó (1:291)
 2. Caldas (1:420)
 3. Risaralda (1:500)
 4. Antioquia (1:554)
 5. Quindío (1:748)

People
Eduardo Blandón (born 1985), Colombian footballer
Jimmy Blandón (born 1969) Ecuadorian footballer
María Teresa Blandón (born 1961), Nicaraguan sociologist, feminist and former revolutionary guerilla
Oscar Danilo Blandón (born 1952) Nicaraguan government official under Anastasio Somoza
Regina Blandón (born 1990) Mexican actress
Roberto Blandón (born 1961) Mexican actor

References

Spanish-language surnames